Neocollyris rufipalpis is a species of ground beetle in the genus Neocollyris in the subfamily Carabinae. It was described by Chaudoir in 1864.

References

Rufipalpis, Neocollyris
Beetles described in 1864